Fredenil Hernaez Castro (born April 27, 1951) is a Filipino politician serving as the Governor of Capiz since 2022. He was the Representative of Capiz's 2nd district from 2001 to 2010 and from 2013 to 2022. He had served as a House Deputy Speaker and as the House Majority Leader.

Political career
Castro was first elected to the House of Representatives in 2001, representing the 2nd district of Capiz. He was re-elected in 2004 and 2007, thus reaching the limit of three consecutive terms in 2010. During his first two terms in the House, Castro was a member of the Liberal Party and an ally of fellow Capiznon Mar Roxas (who at that time was trade secretary and later a senator). In the 2007 elections, he ran under Lakas–CMD, the party supporting then-President Gloria Macapagal Arroyo. He also served as the chairman of the party's Capiz chapter.

In 2009, Castro also chaired the Capiz-based local party Ugyon Kita Capiz (UKC). With UKC, his wife Jane Tan-Castro was elected to the position he vacated. Jane served as the 2nd district's representative from 2010 to 2013. The Castros also allied themselves with former agriculture undersecretary Jocelyn Bolante, who was facing allegations of plunder. Bolante was UKC's vice-chairman who unsuccessfully ran for governor in 2010.

Castro successfully returned to the House in 2013. Running under the National Unity Party (NUP; formed by disgruntled Lakas members), he defeated Maria Andaya of the Liberal Party. He then became chair of the House Committee on Suffrage and Electoral Reforms in the 16th Congress. 

In November 2013, Castro's committee unanimously approved House Bill 3587 or the Anti-Political Dynasty Act of 2013, which aims to prohibit relatives up to the second degree of consanguinity to hold or run for public offices in successive, simultaneous, or overlapping terms. It was the first time since 1988 that an anti-political dynasty bill passed the committee level. Castro then delivered the bill's sponsorship speech in May 2014, calling on his colleagues to "place the interest of the country ahead of personal interest".

Castro was unopposed in the 2016 elections. In the 17th Congress, he was elected by the House as one of the deputy speakers under Speaker Pantaleon Alvarez. 

Before they were elected to their leadership posts, Castro and Alvarez co-authored House Bill No. 1 which aimed to restore capital punishment. The bill proposed lethal injection for crimes such as human trafficking, plunder, treason, parricide, infanticide, rape, piracy, bribery, kidnapping, illegal detention, robbery, car theft, destructive arson, terrorism, and drug-related cases. 

Castro voted for the abolition of capital punishment back in 2006, but has changed his mind, explaining that he "could not accept the way crimes are being committed" in the country. The bill was approved by the House on its third and final reading on March 7, 2017. However, numerous amendments transformed it into House Bill No. 4727 with only drug-related crimes as capital offenses, in support of President Rodrigo Duterte's war on drugs. 

Castro and Alvarez also co-authored House Bill No. 2 which aims to lower the age of criminal responsibility to 9 years old. Their joint statement reasoned that youth offenders "commit crimes knowing they can get away with it" and that adult criminals "knowingly and purposely make use of youth below 15 years old to commit crimes… aware that they cannot be held criminally liable." The bill was criticized by child rights advocates, the Commission on Human Rights (CHR), the Catholic Bishops' Conference of the Philippines (CBCP), and opposition legislators. On January 28, 2019 the House approved on the third and final reading House Bill No. 8858, which aimed to set the age of criminal responsibility at 12 years old instead. He also served as Majority Floor Leader of the House during the 17th Congress.

Personal life
He took up a Bachelor of Arts at Colegio de la Purisima Concepcion, graduating in 1971, and he attained a Bachelor of Laws in San Beda College in 1975. He is a member of the Legal Management Council of the Philippines and the Association of Bank Lawyers of the Philippines. 

He is married to Jane Tan. The couple reportedly became parents to twins through a Russian surrogate mother.

References

 
 

|-

|-

|-

20th-century Filipino lawyers
People from Capiz
1951 births
Living people
Liberal Party (Philippines) politicians
Members of the House of Representatives of the Philippines from Capiz
San Beda University alumni
Deputy Speakers of the House of Representatives of the Philippines
Visayan people